Thap Yai Chiang is a subdistrict in the Phrom Phiram District of Phitsanulok Province, Thailand.

Geography
Thap Yai Chiang lies in the Nan Basin, which is part of the Chao Phraya Watershed.

Administration
The following is a list of the subdistrict's muban, which roughly correspond to villages:

References

Tambon of Phitsanulok province
Populated places in Phitsanulok province